Events from the year 1975 in the United Kingdom.

Incumbents
Monarch – Elizabeth II
Prime Minister – Harold Wilson (Labour)
Parliament – 47th

Events

January
 6 January – Brian Clough, the former manager of Derby County and more recently Leeds United, is appointed manager of Football League Second Division strugglers Nottingham Forest.
 14 January – Seventeen-year-old heiress Lesley Whittle, daughter of the late bus operator George Whittle (1905–1967), is kidnapped from her home near Bridgnorth in Shropshire by Donald Neilson.
 15 January – International Women's Year is launched in Britain by Princess Alexandra and Barbara Castle.
 24 January – Donald Coggan is enthroned as the Archbishop of Canterbury.

February
 6 February – Jensen, the luxury carmaker, makes 700 of its employees redundant – cutting its workforce by two-thirds.
 11 February – Margaret Thatcher defeats Edward Heath in the Conservative Party leadership election, becoming the party's first female leader. Thatcher, 49, was Education Secretary in Edward Heath's government from 1970 to 1974.
 13 February – Britain's coal miners accept a 35% pay rise offer from the government.
 26 February – A fleeing Provisional Irish Republican Army member shoots and kills an off-duty Metropolitan Police officer, Stephen Tibble, 22, as he gave chase.
 28 February – The Moorgate tube crash; 43 people are killed.

March
 1 March – Aston Villa, chasing promotion from the Football League Second Division, wins the Football League Cup with the only goal of the Wembley final against Norwich City being scored by Ray Graydon.
 4 March – Actor Charlie Chaplin, 85, is knighted by the Queen.
 7 March – The body of teenage heiress Lesley Whittle, who disappeared from her Shropshire home in January, is discovered in Staffordshire. She had been strangled on a ledge in drains below Bathpool Park near Kidsgrove.
 8 March – First appearance of Davros in Doctor Who.
 25 March – A large National Front rally is held in London, in protest against European integration.
 26 March – British Leyland releases their new family saloon, the Morris 18-22 wedge styled by Harris Mann to replace the ageing Austin 1800 Landcrab range. There are Austin, Morris and the luxury Wolseley versions at launch. However, in less than six months, the entire range is rebranded as the Princess and the marque "Wolseley" is abandoned.

April
 3 April – Monty Python and the Holy Grail is released in the UK.
 5 April – Manchester United clinches promotion back to the First Division one season after relegation.
 9 April – The comedy film Monty Python and the Holy Grail is released. 
 13 April – A 22-year-old woman is raped at her bedsit in Cambridge. Cambridgeshire Police believe that she was the sixth victim of a rapist who had been operating across the city since October last year. In June, the police arrest 47-year-old Peter Cook for the rapes; he is sentenced to life imprisonment in October.
 24 April – Unemployment exceeds the 1,000,000 mark for March 1975.
 26 April
 A conference of Labour Party members vote against continued membership of the EEC.
 Derby County win the Football League First Division title for the second time in four seasons.

May
 May – Led Zeppelin return to the UK to play five sold-out shows at Earls Court in London.
 1 May – Vauxhall launches the Chevette, Britain's first production small hatchback, which is similar in concept to the Italian Fiat 127 and French Renault 5.
 3 May – West Ham United win the second FA Cup of their history by defeating Fulham 2–0 in the Wembley final. Alan Taylor scores both goals.
 5 May – St Leonard's Church, Streatham is gutted by fire.
 16 May – Major reorganisation of local government in Scotland under the Local Government (Scotland) Act 1973, creating nine new regions and comprehensively redrawing the administrative map.
 27 May – Dibbles Bridge coach crash: a tour coach runs away following brake failure and falls off a bridge near Hebden, North Yorkshire, en route to Grassington, killing the driver and 31 female pensioners on board, the highest ever toll in a UK road accident.
 28 May – Leeds United are beaten 2–0 by Bayern Munich of West Germany in the European Cup final in Paris, France. Peter Lorimer had a goal for Leeds disallowed and this sparks a riot by angry supporters, who invade the pitch and tear seats away from the stands.
 31 May
 The European Space Agency is established, with the UK being one of the ten founding members.
 Jim'll Fix It, presented by Jimmy Savile, is first broadcast on BBC One television.

June
 2 June – Snow showers occur across as the country even as far south as London which last happened in 1761.
 5 June – 67% of voters support continuing membership of the EEC in a referendum.
 9 June – Proceedings in Parliament are broadcast on radio for the first time.
 11 June – In Uganda, British author and adventurer Denis Hills is sentenced to death by firing squad for referring to Idi Amin as a 'village tyrant'.
 13 June – UEFA places a three-year ban on Leeds United from European competitions due to the behaviour of their fans at last month's European Cup final.
 14 June – Ambulance crews in the West Midlands stage a ban on non-emergency calls in a dispute over pay and hours.
 17 June – Leeds United lodge an appeal against their ban from European competitions.
 19 June – A coroner's court jury returns a verdict of wilful murder, naming Lord Lucan as the murderer, in the inquest on Sandra Rivett, the nanny who was found dead at his wife's London home seven months previously.
 30 June – UEFA reduces Leeds United's ban from European competitions to one season on appeal.

July
 July – The Government and Trades Union Congress agree to a one-year cash limit on pay rises.
 5 July – A 36-year-old Keighley woman, Ann Rogulskyj, is badly injured in a hammer attack in an alleyway in the West Yorkshire town.
 19 July – Hatton Cross tube station is opened, completing the first phase of the extension of London Underground's Piccadilly line to Heathrow Airport.

August
 1 August – The Government's anti-inflation policy comes into full effect. During the year, inflation reaches 24.2% - the second-highest recorded level since records began in 1750, and the highest since 1800. A summary of the White Paper Attack on Inflation is delivered to all households.
 11 August – British Leyland Motor Corporation comes under British government control.
 14 August – Hampstead enters the UK Weather Records with the Highest 155-min total rainfall at 169mm.
 15 August 
 The Birmingham Six are wrongfully sentenced to life imprisonment. (They are released 1991.)
 A 46-year-old Halifax woman, Olive Smelt, is severely injured in a hammer attack in an alleyway in the town.
 16 August – Football hooliganism strikes on the opening day of the English league season, with hundreds of fans being arrested at games across the country - the total number of arrests exceeds seventy at the stadiums of Wolverhampton Wanderers and Leicester City.
 19 August – Headingley cricket ground is vandalised by people campaigning for release from prison of the armed robber George Davis. A scheduled test match between England and Australia which was meant to take place there has to be abandoned. This is the climax to a campaign in which the slogan George Davis is Innocent was widely sprayed throughout London.
 21 August – The unemployment rate reaches the 1,250,000 mark.
 27 August – A 14-year-old, Tracy Browne, is badly injured in a hammer attack in a country lane at Silsden, near Keighley.
 31 August – Cavalcade of steam locomotives from Shildon, County Durham, to Darlington, County Durham, to mark the 150th anniversary of the Stockton and Darlington Railway.

September
 September – Chrysler UK launches its new Alpine five-door family hatchback, a modern front-wheel drive car to compete with the conventional Ford Cortina, Morris Marina and upcoming Vauxhall Cavalier rear-wheel drive saloons. The new car is also built in France as the Simca 1307.
 5 September – The London Hilton hotel is bombed by the IRA, killing two people and injuring 63 others.
 19 September – The first episode of the popular sitcom Fawlty Towers is broadcast on BBC Two.
 24 September – Dougal Haston and Doug Scott become the first British people to climb Mount Everest.
 27 September – The National Railway Museum is opened in York, becoming the first national museum outside London.
 28 September–3 October – The Spaghetti House siege, in which nine people are taken as hostages, takes place in London.

October
 October
 Vauxhall announces its second new model launch of the year - the Cavalier, which replaces the Victor, is based on the German Opel Ascona, and is a direct competitor for the big-selling Ford Cortina.
 Statistics show that Britain is in a double-dip recession, as the economy contracted for the second and third quarters of the year.
 9 October – An IRA bomb explosion outside Green Park tube station near Piccadilly in London kills one person and injures twenty other people.
 13 October – Norton Villiers, the Wolverhampton-based motorcycle producer, closes down with the loss of 1,600 jobs after being declared bankrupt.
 23 October – Oncologist Gordon Hamilton Fairley is killed in London by an IRA bomb intended for Sir Hugh Fraser.
 28 October – Dr. No (film) is broadcast on ITV, the first time a Bond film is shown on British television.
 30 October – West Yorkshire Police launch a murder investigation after 28-year-old prostitute Wilma McCann is found dead in Leeds. She later becomes known as Peter Sutcliffe's first murder victim.
 31 October – Queen's "Bohemian Rhapsody" is released.

November
 3 November – A petroleum pipeline from Cruden Bay to Grangemouth across Scotland is formally opened by HM The Queen.
 6 November – The first public performance by punk rock band the Sex Pistols, takes place.
 12 November – The Employment Protection Act establishes Acas to arbitrate industrial disputes, extends jurisdiction of employment tribunals, establishes a Maternity Pay Fund to provide for paid maternity leave and legislates against unfair dismissal.
 16 November – British and Icelandic ships clash, marking the beginning of the third Cod War.
 27 November – Ross McWhirter, co-founder with his twin of the Guinness Book of Records, is shot dead by the Provisional Irish Republican Army for offering reward money to informers.
 29 November – Former racing driver Graham Hill, 46, dies in an air crash in Hertfordshire.

December
 December – Donald Neilson, 39, is arrested in Mansfield, Nottinghamshire, on suspicion of being the "Black Panther" murderer who was believed to have carried out five murders in the last two years.
 5 December – The Government ends Internment of suspected terrorists in Northern Ireland.
 6–12 December – Balcombe Street Siege: IRA members on the run from police break into a London flat, taking the residents hostage. The siege ends after six days with the gunmen giving themselves up to the police.
 25 December  
 The heavy metal band Iron Maiden is formed by Steve Harris in London.
 The Wizard of Oz (1939 film) is shown on British television for the first time, on BBC One.
 29 December – Two new laws, the Sex Discrimination Act 1975 and the Equal Pay Act 1970, come into force aiming to end unequal pay of men and women in the workplace.

Undated
 The Willis Building (Ipswich) is completed, a key early example of Foster Associates' 'high-tech' architectural style.
 The British National Oil Corporation is set up.
 First annual payment of Short Money made to the Official Opposition in the House of Commons to help with its costs for Parliamentary business (named after Edward Short, Leader of the House).
 The Fisher Meredith law firm is established.
 Jackie Tabick becomes the first female rabbi in the British Isles.
 The white-tailed sea eagle is re-introduced to the UK, on the Isle of Rum.

Publications
 Malcolm Bradbury's campus novel The History Man.
 Agatha Christie's final Hercule Poirot novel Curtain.
 Shirley Conran's guide Superwoman.
 Richard Crossman's The Diaries of a Cabinet Minister (posthumous), after a legal battle with the Government which wished to suppress publication.
 Colin Dexter's first Inspector Morse novel Last Bus to Woodstock.
 Ruth Prawer Jhabvala's novel Heat and Dust.
 David Lodge's campus novel Changing Places.
 Paul Scott's novel A Division of the Spoils, the final part of the Raj Quartet.
 Gerald Seymour's thriller Harry's Game.

Births
 4 January – David Carrick, serial rapist
 6 January – Jason King, radio and television host
 8 January – Chris Simmons, actor  
 13 January – Shazia Mirza, comedian
 20 January – Zac Goldsmith, environmentalist and politician
 21 January – Nicky Butt, footballer
 24 January 
 Paul Marazzi, singer 
 Lucy Montgomery, comedian, actress and writer
 28 January – Lee Latchford-Evans, singer
 5 February – Alison Hammond, actress and television presenter
 18 February
 Keith Gillespie, footballer
 Gary Neville, footballer
 25 February – Naga Munchetty, television presenter and journalist
 12 March – Amanda Milling, Chairman of the Conservative Party
 21 March 
 Justin Pierce, British-American actor (died 2000)
 Mark Williams, snooker player
 9 April – Robbie Fowler, footballer
 13 April – Bruce Dyer, footballer
 20 April – Olly Robbins, civil servant
 2 May – David Beckham, footballer
 17 May – Jonti Picking, animator, voice actor and internet personality  
 18 May – John Higgins, snooker player
 20 May –  Graham Potter, football player and manager
 22 May – Kelly Morgan, badminton player
 27 May – Jamie Oliver, chef and television personality
 29 May
 Melanie Brown, pop singer (Spice Girls)
 Sarah Millican, born Sarah King, comedian
 4 June 
 Russell Brand, comedian and actor
 Alex Wharf, English cricketer 
 10 June – Darren Eadie, English footballer and manager
 14 June – Laurence Rickard, actor, writer and comedian
 19 June – Ed Coode, rower
 12 July – Hannah Waterman, actress
 13 July – Gareth Edwards, director  
 15 July – Jill Halfpenny, actress
 17 July – Konnie Huq, television presenter
 26 July – Liz Truss, politician
 30 July – Graham Nicholls, artist
 31 July – Stephanie Hirst, born Simon Hirst, radio DJ
 11 August – Asma al-Assad, born Asma Akhras, spouse of President of Syria
 22 August – Sheree Murphy, actress
 18 September – Ritchie Appleby, football player
 23 September – Chris Hawkins, radio personality
 25 September – Declan Donnelly, television presenter and one half of Ant and Dec
 5 October – Kate Winslet, actress
 7 October – Tim Minchin, English-born singer-songwriter and comic performer
 9 October – Joe McFadden, actor
 16 October – Sally Biddulph, journalist and presenter
 27 October – Zadie Smith, born Sadie Smith, novelist
 12 November – Katherine Grainger, rower
 13 November – Gary Burgess, broadcaster and journalist (died 2022)
 18 November – Anthony McPartlin, television presenter and one half of Ant and Dec
 5 December – Ronnie O'Sullivan, snooker player
 12 December – Jackie Brady, gymnast
 20 December – Jacqui Oatley, sports presenter

Deaths
 31 January – Bernard Fitzalan-Howard, 16th Duke of Norfolk, peer and Earl Marshal (born 1908)
 8 February – Robert Robinson, organic chemist, Nobel Prize laureate (born 1886)
 12 February – Bernard Knowles, film director and screenwriter (born 1900)
 14 February
 Julian Huxley, biologist (born 1887)
 P. G. Wodehouse, comic writer (born 1881)
 22 February – Lionel Tertis, violist (born 1876)
 26 February – Stephen Tibble, London police officer (shot) (born 1953)
 28 February – Neville Cardus, writer on cricket and music (born 1888)
 3 March
 Sandy MacPherson, theatre organist (born 1897 in Canada)
 T. H. Parry-Williams, poet (born 1887)
 27 March – Sir Arthur Bliss, composer and conductor (born 1891)
 3 April – Mary Ure, actress (born 1933)
 14 April – Michael Flanders, actor and songwriter (born 1922)
 23 April – William Hartnell, actor (born 1908)
 24 April – Pete Ham, musician (born 1947; suicide)
 20 May – Barbara Hepworth, sculptor (born 1903)
 21 May – A. H. Dodd, historian (born 1891)
 3 June – Sir Christopher Bonham-Carter, admiral and Treasurer to the Duke of Edinburgh (1959–1970) (born 1907)
 5 June – Lester Matthews, actor (born 1900)
 9 June – Albert Spencer, 7th Earl Spencer, aristocrat (born 1892)
 27 June – Arthur Salter, 1st Baron Salter, politician and academic (born 1881)
 28 June – William Ibbett, submariner and radio broadcaster (born 1886)
 2 July – James Robertson Justice, actor (born 1907)
 7 August – Jim Griffiths, politician (born 1890)
 10 September – George Paget Thomson, physicist, Nobel Prize laureate (born 1892)
 22 October – Arnold J. Toynbee, historian (born 1889)
 23 October – Gordon Hamilton Fairley, oncologist (murdered) (born 1930 in Australia)
 27 October – Frederick Charles Victor Laws, Royal Air Force officer, pioneer of aerial reconnaissance (born 1887)
 25 November – Moyna Macgill, actress (born 1895)
 27 November – Ross McWhirter, co-founder of the Guinness Book of Records (assassinated) (born 1925)
 29 November
 Tony Brise, racing driver (born 1952)
 Graham Hill, racing driver (born 1929)
18 December – R. Ifor Parry, minister, teacher and philanthropist, 67

See also
 List of British films of 1975

References

 
Years of the 20th century in the United Kingdom